Based in Glen Osmond, South Australia, the Australian Society of Viticulture and Oenology (ASVO) is a non-political organization that was founded in 1980 to serve the interests of practicing winemakers and viticulturists by encouraging the exchange of technical information.  It publishes the Australian Journal of Grape and Wine Research and has over 1,300 individual and corporate members.

Objectives
The organization's major objectives are:

"To encourage, stimulate, support and promote the dissemination of research or technical information in viticulture and oenology or other sciences directly applied to viticulture and oenology;
To provide a forum for the presentation, discussion and publication of such research and technological developments for the advancement of science and promotion of common welfare; and
To promote education in viticulture and oenology and help ensure and maintain the highest standards of quality for such educational objectives."

See also
Australian wine

References

External links
The Australian Society of Viticulture and Oenology

1980 establishments in Australia
Wine industry organizations
Business organisations based in Australia
Culture of South Australia
Scientific organizations established in 1980